The climate of the city of Sydney, Australia is humid subtropical (Köppen: Cfa), shifting from mild and cool in winter to warm and hot in the summer, with no extreme seasonal differences as the weather is moderated by proximity to the ocean, although more contrasting temperatures are recorded in the inland western suburbs. Despite the fact that there is no distinct dry or wet season, rainfall peaks in the first few months of the year and is at its lowest just around the middle of the year, though precipitation can be erratic throughout the year. Precipitation varies across the region, with areas adjacent to the coast being the wettest. According to the Bureau of Meteorology, Sydney falls in the temperate climate zone which has warm to hot summers and no dry season. Sydney's plant hardiness zone ranges from zone 11a to 9b throughout the metropolitan area.

Sydney has 109.5 clear days and 127.2	cloudy days annually, though it has over 300 days of visible sunshine if partly cloudy days or sunny breaks are counted. Overall, Sydney has just about 66% of possible sun for Jun-Aug and around 54% for Dec-Feb, making winter sunnier than summer on average. Sydney's heat is predominantly dry in spring, but usually humid in the summertime. On some hot summer days, low pressure troughs increase humidity and southerly busters decrease temperatures by late afternoon or early evening. In the warm season, particularly late summer and early autumn, troughs combined with a humid air mass can bring large amounts of rainfall, and in late autumn to early winter, the city can be affected by east coast lows. When the subtropical ridge is north of Sydney in late winter to early spring, the wind comes from the west or inland. As the ridge moves south in summer and autumn, the winds become easterly.

Sydney experiences an urban heat island effect, making certain parts of the city more vulnerable to extreme heat, particularly the west. Efforts have been introduced to investigate and mitigate this heat effect, including increasing shade from tree canopies, adding rooftop gardens to high rise structures and changing pavement colour. The El Niño Southern Oscillation, the Indian Ocean Dipole and the Southern Annular Mode play an important role in determining Sydney's weather patterns: drought and bushfire on the one hand, and storms and flooding on the other. Sydney is prone to heat waves and drought, which have become more common in the 21st century. Furthermore, the region of Sydney, and as well as the rest of the New South Wales coastline, is warmed by the East Australian Current.

Seasons

Summer
 

Summer in Sydney tends to vary, but it is generally warm to hot. Though at times, sea breezes moderate the temperatures and raise humidity. Sydney summers are characterised by rapid changes of weather, with humidity and rain not uncommon in the city although thunderstorms are more common in the west. The ultraviolet index rating in the summer averages at 12, but can reach 13 in the midst of the season, which may lead to skin damage among those having light skin.

Furthermore, most mornings and nights are muggy, with the 9am relative humidity ranging from 69% to 75%.

In late spring and summer, Sydney can sometimes get northwesterly winds from the Outback, which are dry and hot, making the temperatures soar above , with the relative humidity as low as 15%. This happens after the northwesterlies are carried entirely over the continental landmass, not picking up additional moisture from a body of water and retaining most of their heat. On these occasions, Sydney can experience the fury of the desert climate, although they are often ended with a Southerly Buster, which is a windy, shallow cold front that sweeps up from the southeast abruptly cooling the temperature. At times, it may be accompanied by a thunderstorm and drizzle, and it may keep the temperatures cool the following few days as well. These strong, hot, northwesterly winds from the interior always precede a vigorous, westerly cold front (which usually drags warm inland air towards the southern and eastern coasts).

In contrast, western suburbs such as Liverpool and Penrith have 41 and 67 days with temperatures above , 10 and 19 days above , and, 1 and 4 days above , respectively.

The highest recorded maximum temperature in Sydney was recorded at Penrith with a high of 48.9 °C (120 °F) on 4 January 2020. A similar minimum temperature has also been recorded in the western suburbs.

Autumn

Although, unlike late summer, the nights may be seemingly cooler and crispier. Most heavy rainfall events usually occur in late summer and early autumn as the subtropical ridge of high pressure, which rotates counterclockwise, is to the south of Australia and therefore give way for moist easterlies from the Tasman Sea and as well as low pressure systems to penetrate the region.

The transition from late summer to autumn is gradual, with noticeably cooler and crisper conditions taking in effect by around mid-April. In mid-autumn, the highs typically average at a pleasant , rarely going above  or below . Wintry highs of  may be expected in the last week of autumn.

Temperatures in autumn are usually consistent and stable, lacking any extremes that tend to be experienced in spring and summer. Due to moist easterlies that prevail in this season, foggy mornings should be expected. The average 9am relative humidity in autumn ranges from 72% to 80% in the Sydney region, the highest in the year.

Winter

Such low temperatures may provide mild to moderate frost in the western suburbs. Winter in central Sydney tends to be more mild where the lows rarely drop below , and highs hovering at around  mainly due to proximity to the ocean. Furthermore, Sydney CBD (Observatory Hill) has never recorded frost, whereas coastal cities in the country on similar latitudes, such as Perth, Esperance and Adelaide, and those further north of Sydney such as Coffs Harbour, Port Macquarie, Hervey Bay and Sunshine Coast, have recorded frost or temperatures below .

In the west, Liverpool and Richmond have 4 and 38 nights, respectively, where temperatures dip below . On average, only 1 night in Liverpool and 17 nights in Richmond have lows going below . Such cool lows in the far west are contributed to by a temperature inversion and a mountain breeze effect caused by the Blue Mountains, which impact the suburbs on their footsteps. Similar low maximums have been recorded in the Sydney region in winter. 9am humidity ranges from 61% to 74% across the Sydney region, with the more higher figures experienced in June mornings.

Sydney receives around 15 days of fog annually, which occurs in winter mornings, but more often in June when moist easterlies dominate. The inland suburbs generally receive radiation fog due to nocturnal cooling under a clear sky of humid maritime air that was brought inland by the previous day's sea breeze. The coastal suburbs mostly get an advective fog, which floats ashore from the meeting of warm water offshore and cold water nearby on the land. Heavier rain and cloudiness are also to be expected more in June, on average, than the latter winter months.

As the subtropical ridge is north of Sydney in mid-to-late winter, it picks up dry westerlies from the continent's interior because of its anticlockwise rotation, thus producing more sunny days in the region, hence why August has the highest sunshine percentage of any other month. In early winter, the UV index averages at 2, which means it's safe to be outdoors unprotected, but it reaches 3 by the end of the season (therefore sun protection is required for the general population).

Spring
  
Early spring is rapidly transitional.

Hot air from the interior that soars temperatures to over  can be expected, especially in the months of October and November. These conditions are rare in September, but not unheard of.

Extreme, changeable and inconsistent temperatures are much more prevalent in spring than other seasons. Such extremes usually happen in mid-to-late spring. Other seasons seldom see such fluctuations in a day's span. Furthermore, the diurnal range is higher in this season than it is in autumn.

D'harawal seasons 
The Sydney Basin is in the traditional lands of the Dharawal people. The Dharawal describe six seasons for their country which extends from the southern shores of Port Jackson (Sydney Harbour) to the northern shores of the Shoalhaven River, and from the eastern shores of the Wollondilly River system to the eastern seaboard.

January–March (Burran): Hot and dry
April–June (Marrai'gang): Wet, becoming cooler
June–July (Burrugin): Cold, frosty, short days
July–August (Wiritjiribin): Cold and windy
September–October (Ngoonungi): Cool, getting warmer
November–December (Parra'dowee): Warm and wet

Warm and cool periods

Seven (of the ten) warmest years in 151 years of recordkeeping have occurred in the ten years between 2001 and 2010, with this decade being the warmest on record for minimum temperatures.

The Bureau of Meteorology reported that the summer of 2007–08 was the coolest in 11 years, the wettest in six years, the cloudiest in 16 years, and one of only three summers in recorded history to lack a maximum temperature above . The Bureau of Meteorology reported that 2009 was a warm year.

In 2013, the city had the warmest July and September on record, with September being one of the driest. The warming trend continued in 2016 as Sydney's warmest autumn ever was recorded. July 2017 to June 2018 in southeastern Australia proved to be the hottest financial year on record with maximum temperatures being the warmest on record and minimums above average.

Sydney's 2017 mean temperature of  degrees was   degrees above the long term average and the second highest value in 158 years of records. The warmest year on record was 2016, with a mean temperature of  degrees. On 7 January 2018, Sydney was the hottest place on Earth. In April 2018, Sydney had the longest running hot spell for that month with nine consecutive days of temperatures reaching . Furthermore, the airport and parts of the western suburbs also broke heat records in that month.

The 2020-21 summer was the coolest in a decade due to La Nina's influence. On June 10, 2021, Sydney CBD had its coldest day since 1984 and the coldest June day since 1899, where it reached a maximum of just . Bankstown, a western suburb, only reached , its coldest day in 50 years, with nearby suburbs registering a similar temperature. These unusually cold maximums were caused by a cut-off low, which is a slow moving, sizeable Antarctic cold air mass that got "cut-off" from the westerly trough systems of cold air in the south where it reached the east coast. August 2021 registered 15 consecutive winter days above , the first time in 163 years of records, which was achieved due to a lack of cold fronts or rain over NSW during the month and a blocking high in Southern Australia that prevented cold fronts from reaching the continent.

Microclimate

The dramatic temperature difference between coastal and inland areas is caused by a combination of desert-warmed air from central Australia reaching the west, and as well as density of housing, lack of vegetation or open spaces, and the Blue Mountains which help trap the hot air.

Such extreme temperature differences in the Sydney metropolitan area usually occur in late spring when the western Pacific Ocean is still quite cool and the inland air is warm. Furthermore, within the CBD, heat maps show the area around Central Station (in Haymarket) is  warmer than Circular Quay and surrounds, making it the hottest place in the CBD.

According to ecologist Sebastian Pfautsch from the University of Freiburg, in Sydney's hot days there could be discrepancies of up to 22 more days above  recorded in urban space compared to a weather station from the Bureau of Meteorology. Because  was recorded in Penrith (on 4 January 2020), it won't be unusual to have a  reading somewhere nearby, especially if it lacked green space and retained heat to intensify  heatwave temperatures. Richmond has the second largest overall temperature range recorded in Australia, after Mitchell, Queensland; .

Urban heat island
A study by the University of Western Australia and RMIT indicated that the western suburbs have a much stronger urban heat island effect than those east of the CBD and that hotter temperatures in the west are human contributed due to solar radiation absorbing materials in black asphalt and dark roofs, anthropogenic heat from cars and less natural environments, thereby creating a "heat dome" that blocks the cooler air from the sea. Greening Australia stated that January mean maximum temperatures in the west have risen at a pace of 0.65 °C per decade, over twice as much as eastern Sydney's 0.28 °C per decade. The OEH warned that further development could cause more exceedingly hot days in the west by 2030. Annually, coastal Sydney sees five heat-related deaths per 100,000 people while the western suburbs see 14 per 100,000.

Urban heat island of the CBD has been efficaciously blocking the cooler air from reaching the inland suburbs because the CBD's "high temperature, is like a wall that stops the sea breeze in its tracks. Over Sydney’s CBD is a heat dome because of the high density of concrete and asphalt. If we want to cool western Sydney and demolish this wall, we need to cool the CBD first", Professor Mattheos Santamouris from UNSW states. Waterbodies and open spaces also provide cooling benefits in urban areas.

According to climate researchers, relatively easy modifications such as constructing fountains and water playgrounds could also lower temperatures in the western suburbs. The city now has 3.6% more trees in 2016 than it did in 2009 and Penrith City Council had planned to plant 100,000 trees from August 2018, in addition to planning a large city park, creating a water-sensitive urban design, street shading, and the use of cool materials in its building developments. Furthermore, Parramatta City Council has installed 20 temperature sensors among different tree species in its suburbs to compare how different species can help reduce urban heat.

Precipitation

Rainfall seasonality

Rainfall is slightly higher or dominant during the first half of the year, particularly in late summer and early autumn, when the ocean has peaked its warmth. At this time of the year, the subtropical ridge is to the south of the continent, thereby directing easterly winds towards the east coast. Rainfall will tend to be lower in the second half of the year when the subtropical ridge is just to the north of the city where it picks up dry winds from the continent's interior towards Sydney (as it rotates counter-clockwise) and this will be when clockwise-rotating low pressure systems are to the south of the continent.

Due to the unpredictability of rain, the wettest and driest months change on a yearly basis. The "wet" and "dry season" is more pronounced in the inland suburbs with late winter to early spring (July–September) having a drying trend and late summer to early autumn being wetter and greener (February–March), making the region more close to the humid subtropical subtype Cwa. The drier winters are due to its rain shadow position on the leeward (eastern) side of the Great Dividing Range, which shield the region from south-westerly cold fronts that arrive from the Southern Ocean.

Rainfall amount

The high amount of rainfall was caused by a combination of the La Nina phase, an anomalously warm Tasman Sea, and a consistently positive Southern Annular Mode (SAM). This surpassed the previous record by a month – The old record was May 3 in 1990 and the following record was May 6 in 1890. Sydney also recorded its wettest July on record that year where  of rain fell during the month, surpassing the July 1950 record.

Storms

East coast lows, which strike from the southeast in the Tasman Sea, provide heavy rainfall typically in autumn to early winter with Sydney CBD being greatly impacted due to its location on the coast. They can make landfall at any time of the year, typically usually during a positive SAM phase. Other rainfall drivers include Black nor'easters (in the warm months), upper-level lows (all year round), Australian northwest cloudbands (autumn-spring) and as well as, albeit rarely, tropical cyclone remnants (warm months) and cut-off lows (cool months).

Due to onshore winds, the CBD is susceptible to some light rain and drizzle – These conditions usually do not penetrate the inland suburbs. However, the western suburbs are more inclined to receive thunderstorms in summer due to the stabilizing effect of a sea breeze in the afternoon near the CBD and Eastern Suburbs, however the stabilizing effect does not always occur as was the case during the 1947 event as according to Newmans report there was a sea breeze on the day it occurred.

On some days, rain may come in drizzle form, though this is rare as most rain comes mostly from major storms. In the warm months, isolated convective showers form when a cold pool arrives from the southwest, particularly on hot and sultry days. These showers usually come in heavy downpours and can include hail, squalls, and drops in temperature whereby offering some respite, but they generally pass very quickly with a clearing trend to sunny and relatively calm weather. Black nor'easters may provide persistent rainfall for a few consecutive days.

The city is rarely affected by cyclones, although remnants of ex-cyclones do affect the city. The city is prone to severe hail storms, such as the 1947 Sydney hailstorm, wind storms, and flash flooding from rain caused either by East Coast Lows (such as the major storm in early June 2007) or ex-tropical cyclone remnants. Scientists have predicted that rainfall will become more unpredictable and temperatures will be on the rise. Parts of western Sydney were substantially flooded during the New South Wales 2021 floods, with many areas around Richmond and Windsor submerged in floodwaters.

Snowfall
Snow is extremely rare in Sydney, with significant snowfall being last reported in the Sydney area on 28 June 1836. The snow event affected trading where sellers were unable to transport goods to markets in the colony. The snowfall occurred at the end of the dalton minimum, a solar cycle period representing low solar activity, where colder temperatures were recorded globally. A keeper of weather observations during that period, T. A. Browne noted:

The Sydney Morning Herald reported on the event, saying:

The Sydney Monitor reported:

Scant snowfall has been recorded in latter dates: On 22 June 1951, light snowflakes (which melted into rain) were reported in the suburbs of Liverpool, Pymble and Kingsgrove. On 18 July 1965, very light snow fell in Berowra Heights and Hornsby. On 21 June 1972, settling snow was allegedly observed in what is now Kellyville Ridge, although it may have been soft hail or ice pellets. On 25 July 1986, melting snow was observed in metropolitan Sydney, in addition to some settling snow being reported in North Ryde. On 27 July 2008, a fall of graupel or soft hail (which was mistaken for snow by residents), blanketed Lindfield, Roseville and Killara in white. Owing to this event, a senior forecaster from the Bureau of Meteorology doubted the 1836 snow account, stating that weather observers in that time period lacked the technology and skill to distinguish snow from soft hail.

Blue Mountains
The Blue Mountains, a temperate oceanic region bordering on Sydney's metropolitan area, have a reputation for snow in winter, with places such as Katoomba, Leura and Blackheath receiving the most snow due to their higher elevation. Despite the reputation, there are only around five snowy days per year in the upper mountains area with two settled falls per season, and another five to ten days of light snow showers or sleet. Settled snow has become less common in recent decades. It is extremely rare to see snow below Lawson.

Drought

 
Sydney's climate appears to be becoming drier; The city has had fewer rain days in recent years than shown in the long-term climate table above. In summer, Sydney can go for long periods without rainfall. The other phenomenon that arises from these long, dry and hot periods is bushfires, which occur frequently in the areas surrounding the city. Water supply is a recurring concern for the city during drought periods. In 2005 the reservoirs reached an all-time low.

Many areas of the city bordering bushland have experienced bushfires, notably in 1994 and 2001–02 — these tend to occur during the spring and summer. Heatwaves, which are regularly occurring in recent years, usually lead to water restrictions and a high risk of bushfires, which sometimes bring a smoky haze to the city. Smog is noticeable on hot days, even without bushfires. On 23 October 2002, drought and record maximum temperatures in eastern Australia produced a large dust storm – The storm arrived in Sydney at about 11am, reducing visibility to a few kilometres. Previous dust storms in the city occurred in April 1994, September 1968, December 1957, and January 1942 – The most severe dust storm to hit Sydney, reducing visibility at Sydney Airport to 500 metres.

The years 2009 and 2010 had dry conditions, according to Bureau of Meteorology. On 23 September 2009, a dust storm that started in South Australia and inland New South Wales blanketed the city with reddish orange skies early in the morning. Originating from the north-eastern region of South Australia, the dust storm lifted thousands of tons of dirt and soil which were then dumped in Sydney Harbour and the Tasman Sea. It stretched as far north as southern Queensland and it was the worst dust storm in 70 years. During that year, Sydney experienced a number of warm winter days, dry gusty winds and another milder dust storm.

Some of the western suburbs recorded the lowest total February rainfall on record. In September 2013, the combination of dry weather, warm temperatures and strong winds brought early-season bushfires. Major bushfires impacted western Sydney and the Blue Mountains, resulting in some evacuations, closed roads, and destroyed homes. The summer of 2013-14 was the driest in 72 years. Observatory Hill only received  of rain in January.

September 2017 was the driest on record, with the gauge receiving only  of rain. Furthermore, in that year, the city received less than half of its long-term average rainfall between July and December. In the late morning and early lunchtime of 22 November 2018, a dust storm, stretching about 500 kilometres, swept through Sydney due to a low pressure trough and cold front that picked up dry soil in drought-ridden areas of far western NSW that week. Milder compared to the 2009 storm, the effect of the dust was still apparent across iconic locations such as the Sydney Opera House and Sydney Harbour Bridge. 2018 in Sydney has been one of the driest in a century, with the Greater Western Sydney farming region being the worst affected.

Due to the widespread bushfires in December 2019, which even affected the western periphery of the city, the Sydney metropolitan area suffered from dangerous smoky haze for several days throughout the month, with the air quality being 11 times the hazardous level in some days, even making it worse than New Delhi's, where it was also equalled to "smoking 32 cigarettes." 2019 was one of Sydney's warmest in 161 years and the driest since 2005, which had a few days of raised dust and as well as declining dam levels. Rainfall in December was just 1.6 millimetres at Observatory Hill, overthrowing the record low of 2.8 millimetres recorded for the month in 1979. June 2022 was the driest in 36 years, registering only  of rain, despite the city having the wettest first half of a year on record.

Wind

Some suburbs in the metropolitan area tend to be the windiest in January, September, October or December, and calmest in the months of May or June. As a whole, the Sydney region is generally the windiest from October to January and calmest from March to June. The more windier locations are those by the coast, such as the eastern suburbs. The prevailing wind annually is northeasterly. In the warm months, only 40% of the time Sydney gets wind directions from the northwest or southwest, which are the dry winds flown from the heated interior of Australia.

Northeasterlies and easterly sea breezes are dominant from early summer to early autumn, because the anticlockwise-rotating subtropical ridge is to the south of the city where it allows winds from the sea to penetrate. Westerlies are dominant in late winter to mid-spring as the subtropical ridge is just to the north of the city, picking up winds from the interior and blocking easterlies from the sea. Westerly winds in Sydney are intensified when the Roaring forties contract towards the southeastern Australia.

Southerly busters are expected from October to the end of March. They typically look like as if a sheet of cloud is rolled up like a scroll by the advancing wind. The change of wind (in the warm months) is sometimes very sudden, where it may be fresh northeasterly and in ten minutes a southerly gale. Katabatic winds are light, south-westerly drainage winds, akin to land breezes, that occur when air of higher density in the Blue Mountains descends under gravity force into the Sydney metropolitan area and the Hawkesbury Basin, usually during a winter night.

Föhn effect

Since Sydney is located on the Great Dividing Range's eastern side, and thus falls on its rain shadow, it experiences a föhn-like type of wind, particularly between late autumn and spring, which is a dry south-westerly that raises the air temperature and provides clear to partly cloudy conditions in the lee of the mountains (in this case, the Sydney Basin). During the phenomena, atmospheric moisture is reduced due to the partial orographic obstruction of comparatively damp low-level air and the subsiding of drier upper-level air in leeward of the mountains.

In the cool season, these föhn-like winds can be particularly damaging to homes and affect flights, in addition to being uncomfortable, as the wind chill factor usually makes the temperatures feel cooler than what they are.

Conversely, the foehn effect is one the few reasons why Sydney and other places in the coastal plain register high temperatures in the warm season but seldom attain cold maximum temperatures in the winter, and also the reason why late winter and early spring have the most clear days in the year, as the Great Dividing Range shelters the region from vigorous westerly cold fronts that arrive from the Southern Ocean.

Historical season descriptions

British
In 1819, British explorer William Wentworth described Sydney's climate as:

Below, Wentworth describes Sydney's seasonal and annual weather patterns in analytical detail:

Classifications

Climate data

Miscellaneous data

Temperature extremes

Highest minimum (Sydney CBD) 

Lowest maximum (Sydney CBD)

Rainfall extremes

Lowest monthly rainfall (Sydney CBD) 

Highest monthly rainfall (Sydney CBD) 

Lowest monthly rainfall (Prospect Reservoir) 

Highest monthly rainfall (Prospect Reservoir)

See also
 Climate of Australia
 Geography of Sydney
 Environment of Australia
 Australian region tropical cyclone
 Climate change in Australia
 Effects of global warming on Australia
 Effects of the El Niño–Southern Oscillation in Australia

Notes

References

External links

 NSW and Sydney monthly climate summary archive
 NSW & Sydney seasonal climate summary archive
 NSW & Sydney annual climate summary archive
 Special Climate Statements

Sydney
Geography of Sydney